Maryland Cookies are a brand name of cookie produced by Burton's Biscuit Company in the United Kingdom.

Background information
The Burton's Biscuit Company started making chocolate chip cookies called Maryland cookies in 1956, and they are today one of the UK's best selling cookies. Over 12 billion Maryland Cookies are sold within Europe each year. The recipe for Maryland Cookies resembles a chocolate chip shortbread.

Flavours
The flavours available for Maryland Cookies are:

Chocolate Chip and Raspberry Cookies (Jammie Dodgers Collaboration)
 Chocolate Chip and Coconut (Export Only)
 Chocolate Chip and Hazelnut Cookies
 Double Chocolate Chip Cookies
 Fudge Brownie Cookies
 Mini Cookies and Milk
 Mini Chocolate Chip Cookies
 Apple Cranberry and Cinnamon Cookies
 Raisin Oat Chocolate Chunk and Maple Syrup Cookies
 Chocolate Chip Cookies
 White Chocolate Chip Cookies
 Limited Edition Triple Chocolate Cookies
 Mint Chip Cookies
 Strawberry and White Chocolate (Limited Edition 2012)
 Chocolate Gooeys
 Hazelnut Gooeys
 Triple Choc Gooeys
 Big & Chunky Summer Fruit Cookies 
 ‘Jaffanator’ Chocolate Orange
 Birthday Cake Minis Cookies
 Honeycomb

Package/wrapping
The packaging claims that Maryland Cookies are "The Nation's Favourite Cookie".

References

External links

Maryland biscuits; Bay Biscuits

Brand name cookies
British snack foods